Zawada  (German Zowade, 1936-45: Lichten in Oberschlesien), is a village in the administrative district of Gmina Głogówek, within Prudnik County, Opole Voivodeship, in south-western Poland, close to the Czech border.

References

Zawada